A masterpiece is a creation that is considered the greatest work of a person's career, or any work of outstanding creativity or skill.

Masterpiece(s) or The Masterpiece may also refer to:

Music
 Masterpiece (quartet), 2013 international champion barbershop quartet
 Masterpiece (band), an Iban rock band from Sibu, Sarawak, Malaysia

Albums
 Masterpiece (The Temptations album) (1973)
 Masterpieces (Bob Dylan album) (1978)
 Masterpiece (The Isley Brothers album) (1985)
 Masterpiece (Just-Ice album) (1990)
 Masterpieces: 1991–2002, a 2005 album by Mustard Plug
 Masterpiece (Nathan album) (2006)
 Masterpiece (Rakim y Ken-Y album) (2006)
 Masterpieces (HammerFall album) (2008)
 The Masterpiece (album), a 2012 album by Bobby Brown
 Masterpiece (Big Thief album) (2016)
 Masterpiece (Thompson Square album) (2018)
 Masterpieces (Little River Band album) (2022)

Songs
 "Masterpiece" (The Temptations song) (1973)
 "Masterpiece" (Gazebo song) (1982)
 "Masterpiece" (Atlantic Starr song) (1992)
 "Masterpiece" (Mami Kawada song) (2009)
 "Masterpiece" (Madonna song) (2012)
 "Masterpiece" (Andy Grammer song) (2014)
 "Masterpiece" (Jessie J song) (2014)
 "Masterpiece" (Basshunter song) (2018)
 "Masterpiece" (DaBaby song) (2021)

Film and television
 Masterpiece (2015 film), an Indian Kannada-language film
 Masterpiece (2017 film), an Indian Malayalam-language film
 The Masterpiece (film) or The Disaster Artist (2017)
 Masterpiece (TV series), an anthology series on PBS
 The Masterpiece, a 2011 film starring Preeti Jhangiani
 "The Masterpiece", a season 7 episode of SpongeBob SquarePants

Other uses
 Masterpiece (game), a 1970 board game
 Masterpiece (novel), a 2008 novel by Elise Broach, illustrated by Kelly Murphy
 Masterpiece (Roy Lichtenstein), a Roy Lichtenstein painting
 The Masterpiece (Hong Kong), a skyscraper in Hong Kong
 Masterpieces: The Best Science Fiction of the Century, a 2001 anthology edited by Orson Scott Card
 Chris "The Masterpiece" Masters  (born 1983), American professional wrestler

See also
 Magnum opus (disambiguation)
 Masterpiece Cakeshop v. Colorado Civil Rights Commission